Riabko is a surname. Notable people with the surname include:

 Alexandre Riabko (born 1978), Ukrainian ballet dancer
 Edgaras Riabko (born 1984), Lithuanian powerboat racer 
 Kyle Riabko (born 1987), Canadian musician, composer, and actor